"A No-Rough-Stuff-Type Deal" is the seventh and final episode of the first season of the American television drama series Breaking Bad. Written by Peter Gould and directed by Tim Hunter, it aired on AMC in the United States and Canada on March 9, 2008.

Plot 

At a high school Parent Teacher Association meeting, Walter White fondles Skyler White beneath the conference room table. In the parking lot, the two of them have sex in Walt's car. Jesse Pinkman, who is now living in the RV, puts his house on the market because of his trauma from the deaths of Krazy-8 and Emilio. Walt tells him about the deal with Tuco, but Jesse says producing two pounds of meth a week is impossible - his suppliers of the pseudoephedrine needed to cook the meth cannot meet their demand.

Walt and Jesse meet Tuco and his men at a junkyard, where they hand him approximately half a pound of meth. Tuco is furious that Walt's end of the bargain was not kept and pays him only $17,000. Nevertheless, Walt says he still wants the $70,000 Tuco promised upfront. Tuco agrees to $52,500, which adds up to $65,625, but threatens dire consequences if the next quota is not met. To make up for it, Walt promises to have four pounds of meth at the next meeting.

At Skyler's baby shower, Marie Schrader presents her with an expensive white gold baby's tiara. In the yard, Walt and Hank have a philosophical conversation about the dividing line between legal and illegal behavior. That night, Walt tells Skyler that he is planning to spend a weekend at a holistic medical clinic after she expressed a desire for alternative therapy. In reality, he is cooking meth with Jesse. Skyler goes to return the tiara and is detained in the store – it turns out that Marie stole it, but Skyler matches her description. She feigns going into labor, persuading them to let her go. Skyler later confronts Marie about the theft, who calmly denies it.

Walt has a plan to manufacture the meth using different precursors, and gives Jesse a list of chemicals and equipment to acquire with the cash fronted by Tuco. Jesse gets everything Walt requested except methylamine, which is kept tightly controlled. Jesse knows of a chemical warehouse with men willing to steal and sell the methylamine for $10,000. Walt decides they will steal the methylamine themselves by using thermite. At night, Walt and Jesse trespass into the warehouse, subdue a security guard by locking him in a portable toilet and place the thermite on a locked door, which melts the metal when lit. The two steal a 40-gallon drum of methylamine and escape.

The next day, Walt and Jesse have mechanical troubles when attempting to start the RV that prevent it from driving. Faced with a deadline, they set up to cook in Jesse's basement, unaware of a house viewing that afternoon. Jesse guards the door to the basement while Walt synthesizes the chemicals, and once a man asks to see the basement, Jesse demands that everyone leaves. When Walt arrives back home, he learns of Marie's theft and wonders if Skyler would ever turn him in for a crime. At the next meeting with Tuco, Walt supplies 4.6 pounds of meth. Despite its blue hue, it is still the same quality and Tuco hands over $91,000. When one of Tuco's men makes an offhanded remark to Walt, Tuco becomes furious and beats the man until he is unconscious, terrifying Walt and Jesse. Tuco then tells Walt to meet next week before he and Gonzo, carrying the beaten man, ride off. Walt and Jesse then wordlessly head back to Jesse's car.

Production 
The episode was written by Peter Gould and directed by Tim Hunter; it aired on AMC in the United States and Canada on March 9, 2008.

Title meaning 
The episode title is a reference to the 1996 film Fargo, in which Jerry Lundegaard used the phrase while discussing the kidnapping of his wife.

Critical reception 
Seth Amitin of IGN gave the episode a rating of 9.1 out of 10.

In 2019 The Ringer ranked "A No-Rough-Stuff-Type Deal" as the 35th best out of the 62 total Breaking Bad episodes. Vulture.com ranked it 28th overall.

References

External links 
 "A No-Rough-Stuff-Type Deal"  at the official Breaking Bad site
 

2008 American television episodes
Breaking Bad (season 1) episodes
Television episodes written by Peter Gould